The 2017 HDF Insurance Shoot-Out was held from September 14 to 17 at the Saville Community Sports Centre in Edmonton, Alberta. The event was held on Week 5 of the 2017–18 World Curling Tour. The total purse was CAD $32,000.

The event was a round robin with four pools followed by an eight-team playoff.

Teams
Teams are listed as follows:

Round Robin Standings

Tiebreakers
(Due to the amount of tiebreakers, games were limited to four ends, except for the Hunkin vs. Fujisawa game.)

Playoffs

Quarterfinals
Saturday, September 16, 8:00 pm

Semifinals
Sunday, September 17, 9:30 am

Final
Sunday, September 17, 1:00 pm

References

External links

2017 in Canadian curling
The Shoot-Out
Curling competitions in Edmonton
2017 in Alberta
2010s in Edmonton
September 2017 sports events in Canada